Waves is the fourth studio album by new wave band Katrina and the Waves, released in 1986 by Capitol Records. It followed their US and UK Top 30 album Katrina and the Waves (1985), reaching No. 49 on Billboard 200 and No. 70 on the UK Albums Chart.
Waves sold less than half of what its predecessor had, generating a modest hit with the single "Sun Street" (UK No. 22).

Reception

In a retrospective review for AllMusic, Matthew Greenwald wrote that although Waves is "not a disaster by any stretch," it's certainly not up to the standards of their previous album Katrina and the Waves. Part of this, according to Greenwald, is because main songwriter Kimberley Rew only contributed two songs to the album. Greenwald felt that there are some fine moments, however, such as Vince de la Cruz's "Sun Street" and Katrina Leskanich's "Tears for Me." He added that Rew's two songs, "Is That It" and "Lovely Lindsay," are "mini-masterpieces", and that they "eventually push the group and this album somewhere near the goal line." In his artist biography on AllMusic, Bruce Eder wrote that Waves was a good enough album but no improvement upon the Katrina and the Waves album. He also felt that the band's work lost its edge between the two album's.

Track listing

Personnel
Katrina and the Waves
Katrina Leskanich – vocals, rhythm guitar
Kimberley Rew – lead guitar, vocals
Vince de la Cruz – bass, rhythm guitar, lead guitar (7), vocals
Alex Cooper – drums, vocals
Additional musicians
Nick Glennie-Smith – keyboards
John "Irish" Earle – brass
Dave Land – brass
Richard Edwards – brass
Eamon Fitzpatrick – brass arrangements 
Technical
Katrina and the Waves – producer
Pat Collier – producer
Scott Litt – producer
Richard Sullivan – second engineer
Bob Ludwig – mastering
Stylorouge – sleeve artwork
Terry Day – hand colouring
Simon Fowler – photography

Charts

Singles

Certifications

References 

Katrina and the Waves albums
1986 albums
Capitol Records albums
Attic Records albums